Market Street Railway may refer to:
 Market Street Railway (nonprofit), a nonprofit organization that supports the operation of the F Market historic streetcar line in San Francisco
 Market Street Railway (transit operator), a former commercial streetcar operator in San Francisco